Chandrikaben Kanjibhai Chudasama is an Indian politician, former state minister and former Member of legislative assembly from Mangrol constituency and belong to the Indian National Congress party and the Koli caste of Gujarat.

References 

Living people

Year of birth missing (living people)
Indian National Congress politicians from Gujarat